Salix commutata, the undergreen willow, is a plant species native to western Canada and the north-western United States. It has been reported from Alaska, Yukon, the Northwest Territories, British Columbia, Alberta, Saskatchewan, Montana, Idaho. Washington and Oregon. It grows on rocky alpine and subalpine slopes, conifer forests, stream banks, bogs, etc.

Salix commutata is a shrub up to 3 m tall. Leaves are elliptic to ovate, up to 10 cm long, sometimes with a few teeth, both sides with some white hairs but not glaucous (waxy).

References

External links
 
 
 
 

commutata
Flora of Alaska
Flora of Yukon
Flora of the Northwest Territories
Flora of Saskatchewan
Flora of Montana
Flora of Washington (state)
Flora of British Columbia
Flora of Alberta
Flora of Oregon
Flora of Idaho
Flora without expected TNC conservation status